This is an incomplete list of major companies or subsidiaries headquartered in Kumanovo, Macedonia.

Defunct companies
Biserka
Jug Turist
Iskra
NRIO Nash Vesnik
Ploshtad
TV Nova

See also
Kumanovo

References

Kumanovo